Erraticodon is an extinct genus of conodonts in the family Chirognathidae.

References

External links 

 
 Erraticodon at fossilworks.org (retrieved 7 May 2016)

Prioniodinida genera